Guidewire Software, Inc., commonly Guidewire, is an American software company based in San Mateo, California. It offers an industry platform for property and casualty (P&C) insurance carriers in the U.S. and worldwide.

The company has been cited as being among the 50 most desirable mid-size Bay Area companies (101 to 500 employees) to work for 2010-2012, and was in the "Top 50 Large Companies" in Glassdoor's Best Places To Work for both 2015 and 2016.

History
The company was established in 2001 and founded by: Ken Branson, James Kwak, John Raguin, and Marcus Ryu from Ariba (and McKinsey, where James and Marcus had met); and John Seybold and Mark Shaw from Kana Software. In September 2011, Guidewire filed with the SEC to raise up to $100 million in an initial public offering (IPO) and first publicly traded on the NYSE in January 2012. Guidewire was later cited as being one of the top IPOs of 2012, even #1.

In 2011, Guidewire settled a patent related lawsuit with Accenture regarding their claims management software.

In 2013, Guidewire acquired Millbrook, Inc., a business intelligence company. In 2016, Guidewire acquired ISCS (cloud computing), FirstBest (underwriting) and EagleEye Analytics. In 2017, Guidewire acquired Cyence, a cyber insurance company.

On August 5, 2019, Guidewire appointed Mike Rosenbaum as CEO.

Products
Guidewire is a recurring revenue software company as it sells term licenses. The company also sells its software as a service on a subscription revenue basis. Its three main software products are ClaimCenter, PolicyCenter, and BillingCenter, each servicing a major component of a P&C insurance carrier. There are a number of add-on modules, as well as an increasing number of value-added online services provided via Guidewire Analytics and Guidewire Marketplace. Guidewire develops the Gosu programming language

References

External links

Customer relationship management software companies
Software companies based in the San Francisco Bay Area
Software companies established in 2001
Companies based in San Mateo, California
Companies listed on the New York Stock Exchange
2012 initial public offerings
Software companies of the United States
2001 establishments in California
American companies established in 2001